
Gmina Głowno is a rural gmina (administrative district) in Zgierz County, Łódź Voivodeship, in central Poland. Its seat is the town of Głowno, although the town is not part of the territory of the gmina.

In 2012, with 1815,58 PLN per person it was the second poorest "rural gmina" in Poland,  according to:"Ranking Zamożności Samorządów 2012"

Villages
Gmina Głowno contains the villages and settlements of Albinów, Antoniew, Boczki Domaradzkie, Boczki Zarzeczne, Bronisławów, Chlebowice, Dąbrowa, Domaradzyn, Feliksów, Gawronki, Glinnik, Helenów, Jasionna, Kadzielin, Kamień, Karasica, Karnków, Konarzew, Lubianków, Mąkolice, Mięsośnia, Ostrołęka, Piaski Rudnickie, Popów Głowieński, Popówek Włościański, Różany, Rudniczek, Władysławów Bielawski, Władysławów Popowski, Wola Lubiankowska, Wola Mąkolska, Wola Zbrożkowa and Ziewanice.

Neighbouring gminas
Gmina Głowno is bordered by the town of Głowno and by the gminas of Bielawy, Dmosin, Domaniewice, Łyszkowice, Piątek, Stryków and Zgierz.

References

Polish official population figures 2006

Glowno
Zgierz County